The Plicatulidae are a family of saltwater clams, marine bivalve mollusks, known commonly as kitten's paws or kittenpaws. These bivalves are related to oysters and scallops. The family has a single living genus, Plicatula, with a second, Harpax known from fossils.

Description
Plicatulidae are small, with weakly convex shells which are irregularly oval or even almost triangular. Typically, they attach themselves to a hard surface by the right valve. The ligament is internal and triangular.

Life cycle
Plicatulidae members start off in the larval stage.

Genera and species
 Harpax Parkinson, 1811
 Plicatula Lamarck, 1801 
 † Pseudoplacunopsis Bittner, 1895 
Plicastulostrea onca: synonym of Plicatula australis Lamarck, 1819 (type by original designation); a species from Thailand 
Synonyms
 Plicatulostrea Simone & Amaral, 2008: synonym of Plicatula Lamarck, 1801
 Spiniplicata [sic]: synonym of Spiniplicatula Habe, 1977: synonym of Plicatula Lamarck, 1801 (misspelling)
 Spiniplicatula Habe, 1977: synonym of Plicatula Lamarck, 1801

References

 Vaught, K.C.; Tucker Abbott, R.; Boss, K.J. (1989). A classification of the living Mollusca. American Malacologists: Melbourne. ISBN 0-915826-22-4. XII, 195 pp
 Bieler, R.; Carter, J. G.; Coan, E. V. (2010). Classification of Bivalve families. Pp. 113-133, in: Bouchet P. & Rocroi J.-P. (2010), Nomenclator of Bivalve Families. Malacologia. 52(2): 1-184
 Coan, E. V.; Valentich-Scott, P. (2012). Bivalve seashells of tropical West America. Marine bivalve mollusks from Baja California to northern Peru. 2 vols, 1258 pp.

External links
 

 
Bivalve families